= 8/4 =

8/4 may refer to:

- August 4 (month-day date notation)
- April 8 (day-month date notation)
